Bakrabad Rural District is in the Central District of Varzaqan County, East Azerbaijan province, Iran. At the National Census of 2006, its population was 3,000 in 687 households. There were 2,896 inhabitants in 821 households at the following census of 2011. At the most recent census of 2016, the population of the rural district was 3,059 in 984 households. The largest of its 21 villages was Bakrabad, with 717 people.

References 

Varzaqan County

Rural Districts of East Azerbaijan Province

Populated places in East Azerbaijan Province

Populated places in Varzaqan County